Cardiff Corinthians F.C. are a football club from Cardiff, Wales. They play in the South Wales Alliance League Premier Division.

History
The club was formed in 1898 when players from the Alpha Cricket Club decided to form a football team to keep in touch during the winter months. With their base at Sophia Gardens, Cardiff for the first six years the team only played friendlies but then joined the Rhymney Valley League. It was in cup competitions that the team made its mark and in 1914 they won the Welsh Amateur Cup beating Holywell 1–0 at Newtown. They have several nicknames including The Corries, Alpha or The Cards (shortened version of Cardiff).

After the war, the club moved to Pengam Farm. Tremorfa and in 1921 took the bold step of joining the professional Western League, but because travelling expenses were so high in 1924 the club opted to join the Welsh League. In 1921 the club played a series of friendly matches against FC Barcelona, losing 4–0, 2–1 and 2–1.

The outbreak of the Second World War interrupted Welsh League football but the Corries continued to play friendlies using a number of grounds. They finally settled at Llandaff Road, Cardiff, a ground which became a permanent home thanks to a loan from former player and patron, Fred Dewey.

In the sixties and seventies the team went up and down the divisions, although the late seventies they finished as Runners Up in the Premier Division and repeated the feat again in 1982. More glory came when in 1985 the club won the Premier Division as well as the Welsh Intermediate Cup.

In the late sixties, the club made a frantic quest for another permanent home as the ground at Canton was lost when the club defaulted on the original loan. For one season the team played on an unenclosed pitch at Pontcanna followed by a season at Maindy Stadium and a couple at Fidlas Avenue in Llanishen. In 1974 the club negotiated a ground share with Radyr Cricket Club and this has been their permanent home since.

The club were relegated at the end of the 2013–14 season.

The club has a long-standing rivalry with fellow Cardiff side Cardiff Grange Harlequins A.F.C. which dates back to the 1980s, when both clubs were fierce cross-city rivals and took part in some mouth-watering fixtures. Both clubs are rarely in the same division, so the long-standing rivalry has not continued over recent seasons.  The 2014–15 season saw both teams in the same division so the rivalries were resumed however Grange Harlequins sadly folded as a result player exodus when funds dried up. As one of Wales oldest clubs Corinthians are now in the Welsh fourth tier of football and have ambitions of regaining their place in the higher echelons and have staked a large expense on player recruitment in their attempt to gain promotion.

Honours
Welsh Amateur Cup
Winners: 1914, 1929, 1930, 1934, 1962
South Wales Football Association Amateur Cup
Winners: 1922–23
South Wales Amateur League
Division One Champions: 1924–25
Division Two Champions: 1970–71
Welsh Youth Cup
Winners: 1955, 1974
Welsh League
Premier Division Champions: 1984–85
Division One Champions: 1970–71, 1977–78
Division Two East Champions: 1955–56, 1959–60
SA Brains Challenge Cup Winners: 1976
Corinthian Cup
Winners: 1973
Welsh Intermediate Cup
Winners: 1985
South Wales Alliance League W John Owen Cup
Winners: 2021–22

References

Football clubs in Wales
Football clubs in Cardiff
Association football clubs established in 1897
1897 establishments in Wales
Radyr
Welsh Football League clubs
South Wales Alliance League clubs
South Wales Amateur League clubs